Max Gunderson (born November 5, 1989) is an American professional soccer player who plays as a defender.

Career
Gunderson played four years of college soccer at the University of the Incarnate Word between 2008 and 2011. He also played for USL PDL clubs Laredo Heat and Austin Aztex.

Gunderson signed for USL Pro club Oklahoma City Energy on February 26, 2014.

References

1989 births
Living people
American soccer players
Incarnate Word Cardinals men's soccer players
Laredo Heat players
Austin Aztex players
OKC Energy FC players
People from Henderson, Nevada
San Antonio FC players
Association football defenders
Soccer players from Nevada
USL League Two players
USL Championship players
Sportspeople from the Las Vegas Valley